Moon is an extinct town in Pennington County, in the U.S. state of South Dakota. The GNIS classifies it as a populated place.

History
Moon was laid out by T. J. Sherwood in 1910, and named in honor of Jack Moon, its first inhabitant. A post office called Moon was established in 1911, and remained in operation until 1953.

References

Ghost towns in South Dakota
Geography of Pennington County, South Dakota